American Rock 'n' Roll is the third solo studio album by American musician Don Felder, best known as a longtime member of Eagles. It was released April 5, 2019 through BMG Rights Management.

The front cover features a Gibson EDS-1275 double-neck guitar.

The album features many musicians such as Slash, Joe Satriani, Mick Fleetwood, Sammy Hagar and Chad Smith.

Track listing
Songs Written By: Don Felder, except where noted

Track listing

 American Rock 'N' Roll (feat. Slash, Mick Fleetwood and Chad Smith) (3:41)
 Charmed (feat. Alex Lifeson) (3:17)
 Falling in Love (4:25)
 Hearts on Fire (Written by Don Felder and David Paich) (4:32)
 Limelight (feat. Orianthi and Richie Sambora) (3:47)
 Little Latin Lover (3:34)
 Rock You (feat. Bob Weir, Joe Satriani and Sammy Hagar (3:42)
 She Doesn't Get It (3:35)
 Sun (4:32)
 The Way Things Have to Be (feat. Peter Frampton) (4:21)
 You're My World (3:48)

Credits:

Lead Vocals/Guitars/Special Guest Vocals/Special Background Vocals: Don Felder, Sammy Hagar, Bob Weir, Peter Frampton

Bass/Moog: Nathan East, Abe Laboriel Sr., Alex Al, Ben White and Chris Chaney

Drums and Percussion/Hand Claps: Mick Fleetwood, Chad Smith, Lenny Castro, Robin Dimaggio, Todd Sucherman, Steve Gadd, Jim Keltner

Keyboards/Hammond B-3 Organ/Accordion: Mike Finnigan, Steve Porcaro, David Paich, Alex Alessandroni, Christophe Lampidecchia, Alessandroni, Kenneth Crouch

Programming: Joe Williams, Robin Dimaggio

Guitars: Slash, Alex Lifeson, Orianthi, Richie Sambora, Joe Satriani, Peter Frampton

Pedal Steel Guitar: Greg Leisz

Background Vocals: Joe Williams, Leah Felder, Monet Owens, Timothy Drury

Produced By: Don Felder

Engineered By: Ed Cherney, Julian Chan, Lynn Peterson, Jr Taylor, Brett Cockingham

Mixed By: Bob Clearmountian

Mastered By: Bernie Grundman

Recorded At: Top Ten, East West, The Seance, The Village Recorder Studios

Photography: Michael Helms

Cover/Art work: Bernie Taupin And Bill Young

Charts

References

Don Felder albums
2019 albums